Gregory James Joly (born May 30, 1954) is a Canadian former ice hockey player who played nine seasons in the National Hockey League (NHL) for the Washington Capitals and Detroit Red Wings. He won the 1981 Calder Cup with the AHL's Adirondack Red Wings.

Joly was drafted first overall in the 1974 NHL amateur draft by the Washington Capitals from the Regina Pats. Washington's general manager, Milt Schmidt, referred to Joly at the time as "the next Bobby Orr", but over his nine seasons playing with Washington (1974–76) and the Detroit Red Wings (1976–83), Joly spent parts of seven seasons on the American Hockey League (AHL) farm teams of those two organizations. After playing 365 National Hockey League (NHL) games over the course of those nine seasons, Joly played his final three years of professional hockey in the AHL. He is considered to have been a draft bust. Joly scored the last goal at Detroit’s Olympia Stadium.

Joly was born in Rocky Mountain House, Alberta.

Career statistics

Awards
 WCHL All-Star Team – 1973 & 1974

References

External links

Profile at hockeydraftcentral.com

1954 births
Living people
Adirondack Red Wings players
Canadian expatriate ice hockey players in the United States
Canadian ice hockey defencemen
Detroit Red Wings players
Ice hockey people from Alberta
National Hockey League first-overall draft picks
National Hockey League first-round draft picks
People from Clearwater County, Alberta
Regina Pats players
Richmond Robins players
Springfield Indians players
Washington Capitals draft picks
Washington Capitals players